Tarsachay is an abandoned village in the Tavush Province of Armenia.

References 

Former populated places in Tavush Province